Mogens Larsen (born 21 March 1950) is a Danish sailor. He competed in the Tempest event at the 1972 Summer Olympics.

References

External links
 

1950 births
Living people
Danish male sailors (sport)
Olympic sailors of Denmark
Sailors at the 1972 Summer Olympics – Tempest
People from Helsingør
Sportspeople from the Capital Region of Denmark